The following are the national records in track cycling in Singapore, maintained by its national cycling federation, Singapore Cycling Federation.

Men

Women

References

External links
Singapore Cycling Federation

Singapore
records
track cycling
track cycling